Guy Colquhoun Richardson (8 September 1921 – 27 October 1965) was a British rower who competed in the 1948 Summer Olympics.

Richardson was born at Guildford, Surrey; he was the son of Alexander Richardson, an army officer and Olympic medalist, and his wife Agnes Thackeray. He attended Cambridge University and in 1947 and 1948, he was a member of the victorious Cambridge crews in the Boat Races. Most of the Cambridge crew of 1948 also rowed for Leander Club at Henley Royal Regatta. The Leander eight were selected to row for Great Britain in the 1948 Summer Olympics and won the silver medal. Richardson died in a plane crash in 1965.

See also
List of Cambridge University Boat Race crews
Rowing at the 1948 Summer Olympics

References

1921 births
1965 deaths
Cambridge University Boat Club rowers
British male rowers
Olympic rowers of Great Britain
Rowers at the 1948 Summer Olympics
Olympic silver medallists for Great Britain
Olympic medalists in rowing
Medalists at the 1948 Summer Olympics
Victims of aviation accidents or incidents in 1965
Victims of aviation accidents or incidents in England